is Yukari Tamura's sixth original album, released on February 27, 2008. The DVD comes with the first pressing limited edition only. It reached the 12th place on the Oricon Weekly Albums Chart.

Track listing 

 Overture ~secret new moon~
 Arrangement and composition: Masatomo Ōta
 Swing Heart
 Lyrics: Uran
 Arrangement and composition: Masatomo Ōta
 
 Lyrics: Uran
 Composition: Kaoru Ōkubo
 Arrangement: Yoshimasa Kawabata & DUX
 Non-Stopping Train
 Lyrics and composition: marhy
 Arrangement: Yoshimasa Kawabata
 
 Lyrics: Karen Shiina
 Arrangement and composition: Masatomo Ōta
 First ending theme song for Magical Girl Lyrical Nanoha StrikerS
 Sand Mark
 Lyrics: Mika Watanabe
 Arrangement and composition: Hideyuki "Daichi" Suzuki
 Petite lumière
 Lyrics: Mika Watanabe
 Arrangement and composition: Jun Ichikawa
 Strings & chorus arrangement: Masatomo Ōta
 Beautiful Amulet
 Lyrics: Karen Shiina
 Arrangement and composition: Masatomo Ōta
 Second ending theme song for Magical Girl Lyrical Nanoha StrikerS
 Interlude ~moonlight flower~
 Arrangement and composition: Masatomo Ōta
 
 Lyrics: Manami Fujino
 Arrangement and composition: DUX
 Sax arrangement: Yoshinari Takegami
 
 Lyrics: Yukiko Mitsui
 Arrangement and composition: Masatomo Ōta
 Brass arrangement: Yoshinari Takegami
 Opening theme song to her radio shows "Yukari Tamura, Mischievous Black Rabbit" and "Café Black Rabbit ~Secret Nook~" (February 2008 - )
 
 Lyrics: Mika Watanabe
 Arrangement and composition: Masatomo Ōta
 
 Lyrics and composition: marhy
 Arrangement: DUX
 Ending theme song to her radio show "Yukari Tamura, Mischievous Black Rabbit"  (February 2008 - )
 Happy Life
 Lyrics and composition: Takeshi Isozaki
 Arrangement: Hideyuki "Daichi" Suzuki
 Finale ~Sweet full moon~
 Arrangement and composition: Masatomo Ōta

DVD 

 MUSIC CLIP
 MAKING MOVIE

References

Yukari Tamura albums
King Records (Japan) albums
2008 albums